"The Man with the Hoe" is a poem by the American poet Edwin Markham, inspired by Jean-François Millet's painting L'homme à la houe, a painting interpreted as a socialist protest about the peasant's plight.

Summary
The poem was first presented as a public poetry reading at a New Year's Eve party in 1898. It was soon published in the San Francisco Examiner in January 1899 after its editor heard it at the same party. The poem was also reprinted in other newspapers across the United States due to a chorus of acclaim. It was used as the opening poem in Markham's 1902 collection The Man with a Hoe  and Other Poems.

The poem portrays the labor of much of humanity using the symbolism of a laborer leaning upon his hoe, burdened by his work, but receiving little rest or reward.

Poem text

Impact 

"The Man with a Hoe" has been called "the battle-cry of the next thousand years". It has been translated into 37 languages, earning Markham about $250,000 over 33 years. After its publication, the poem's content, form, and language have captured the feelings and thoughts of people, drawing attention to social issues such as labor exploitation while helping causes such as the revitalization of efforts pursuing labor reform. The poem also helped Markham's career. The poet became a much sought-after public speaker and his first book of poetry was immediately published to take advantage of the opportunities that became available after the poem established him as one of the American modern poets.

References

1898 poems